Ionuț Ciprian Iancu (born 18 February 1994) is a Romanian handballer who plays as a goalkeeper for CSA Steaua Bucuresti and the Romania national team.

Achievements
Liga Națională: 
Gold Medalist: 2013
Silver Medalist: 2015, 2016, 2017
Cupa României:
Winner: 2013, 2016
Nemzeti Bajnokság I:  
Bronze Medalist: 2018

Individual awards
 World University Championship Best Goalkeeper:  2016
 Gala Premiilor Handbalului Românesc Liga Națională Goalkeeper of the Season: 2019

References

1994 births
Living people
Sportspeople from Ploiești
Romanian male handball players
HC Dobrogea Sud Constanța players
Romanian expatriate sportspeople in Hungary
Expatriate handball players